Colin Evans may refer to:

 Colin Evans (medium), Welsh Spiritualist medium
 Colin Evans (rugby) (1936–1992), Welsh dual-code rugby player